Silvia Salis (born 17 September 1985 in Genoa) is a hammer thrower from Italy.

Biography
Her personal best throw is 71.93 metres, achieved in May 2011 in Savona. She is engaged to the writer and director Fausto Brizzi.

Achievements

National titles
She has won the individual national championship eight times.

3 wins in the discus throw (2010, 2011, 2012)
5 wins in the discus throw at the Italian Winter Throwing Championships (2009, 2010, 2011, 2012, 2014)

See also
Italian all-time lists - Hammer throw

References

External links
 

1985 births
Living people
Italian female hammer throwers
Italian people of Sardinian descent
Athletes (track and field) at the 2008 Summer Olympics
Athletes (track and field) at the 2012 Summer Olympics
Olympic athletes of Italy
Sportspeople from Genoa
World Athletics Championships athletes for Italy
Mediterranean Games gold medalists for Italy
Mediterranean Games bronze medalists for Italy
Athletes (track and field) at the 2009 Mediterranean Games
Mediterranean Games medalists in athletics
Athletics competitors of Fiamme Azzurre
Athletics competitors of Gruppo Sportivo Forestale
Competitors at the 2007 Summer Universiade
Competitors at the 2009 Summer Universiade
21st-century Italian women